Witten is a hamlet in the Netherlands and is part of the Assen municipality in Drenthe. 

Witten is a statistical entity, however the postal authority have placed it under Assen. It was first mentioned in 1294 as Withen. The etymology is not clear. In 1815, it became part of the municipality of Assen. In 1840, it was home to 86 people.

References 

Populated places in Drenthe
Assen